This article lists urban areas of New Zealand—as defined by Statistics New Zealand—ranked by population. Only the 150 largest urban areas are listed.

Urban areas are defined by the Statistical Standard for Geographic Areas 2018 (SSGA18).

See also
 List of cities in New Zealand
 List of towns in New Zealand

References

Lists of urban areas
Urban areas
Urban areas